The Dash for Gas was the 1990s shift by the newly privatized companies in the electricity sector of the United Kingdom towards generation of electricity using natural gas. Gas consumption peaked in 2001 and has been in decline since 2010.

The key reasons for this shift were: (a) political: The privatization of the UK electricity industry in 1990; the regulatory change that allowed gas to be used as a fuel for power generation; (b) economic: the high interest rates of the time, which favoured gas turbine power stations, which were quick to build, over coal and nuclear power stations, which were larger but slower to build; the decline in wholesale gas prices; the desire by the regional electricity companies to diversify their sources of electricity supply and establish a foothold in the profitable generation market; (c) technical: advances in electricity generation technology (specifically combined cycle gas turbine generators (CCGT) with higher relative efficiencies and lower capital costs. An underpinning factor in the dash for gas was the recent development of North Sea gas.

In 1990, gas turbine power stations made up 5% of the UK's generating capacity. By 2002, the new CCGT power stations made up 28% UK generating capacity; gas turbines accounted for a further 2%. It is estimated the Dash for Gas cost £11bn.

Gas-fired power stations with more than 30 MW installed capacity commissioned between 1990 and 2002 are listed below.

References

External links
 Digest of United Kingdom energy statistics (DUKES) at Department of Energy and Climate Change

1990s in the United Kingdom
Electric power generation in the United Kingdom
Electric power infrastructure in the United Kingdom
Natural gas infrastructure in the United Kingdom